is a former Japanese football player.

Playing career
Shirai was born in Kumamoto Prefecture on April 18, 1966. After graduating from Kyoto Sangyo University, he joined Tanabe Pharmaceutical in 1989. He played as regular goalkeeper from first season. In 1991, he moved to Toshiba (later Consadole Sapporo). Although he played many matches until 1992, he could not play at all in the match in 1993. In 1994, he moved to Gamba Osaka. However he could hardly play in the match behind Kenji Honnami and Hayato Okanaka. In 1996, he returned to Consadole Sapporo and became a regular goalkeeper. In 1997, he moved to JEF United Ichihara. He battles with Japan national team goalkeeper Kenichi Shimokawa for regular goalkeeper. Although he played many matches in 1997, he could hardly play in the match in 1998. In 1999, he moved to Omiya Ardija. He played as regular goalkeeper in 3 season and he retired end of 2001 season. However he came back as player in March 2002 because multiple goalkeepers were injured. He did not play in the match and retired in August 2002.

Club statistics

References

External links

1966 births
Living people
Kyoto Sangyo University alumni
Association football people from Kumamoto Prefecture
Japanese footballers
Japan Soccer League players
J1 League players
J2 League players
Japan Football League (1992–1998) players
Tanabe Mitsubishi Pharma SC players
Hokkaido Consadole Sapporo players
Gamba Osaka players
JEF United Chiba players
Omiya Ardija players
Association football goalkeepers